John Snee (born August 25, 1974) is an American former film and television actor.

Career 
Snee appeared in the role of Oliver "Ollie" Cleaver in the television show The New Leave It to Beaver from 1983 to 1989. He also acted in a number of films including Forever and Beyond (1981), Sunset Limousine (1983), Camp Cucamonga (1990), and Captain Nuke and the Bomber Boys (1995).

Filmography

Film

Television

References

External links 
 

1974 births
American male child actors
American male film actors
American male television actors
Living people